Pacca Ghanghra is a village in Kandiaro Taluka of Naushahro Feroze District, Sindh, Pakistan. It is the administrative headquarters of the Pacca Ghanghra Union Council.

The list of villages in Khan Wahan Union Council 
 Bazid Pur
 Soomar Channar

Kandiaro Taluka
Naushahro Feroze District
Union councils of Sindh